Cardross, originally named Grace, is an unincorporated hamlet in Terrell Rural Municipality No. 101, Saskatchewan, Canada. The hamlet is located approximately 45 km north-east of Assiniboia on Township road 102 & Range road 274.

The Post Office was named Cardross from 1926 until closure. It was located at 10-27-W2, prior to 1926 the name was Grace 1910–1926.

See also
 List of communities in Saskatchewan
 Hamlets of Saskatchewan

References

Terrell No. 101, Saskatchewan
Unincorporated communities in Saskatchewan
Ghost towns in Saskatchewan
Division No. 3, Saskatchewan